Rosamond Pinchot (October 26, 1904 – January 24, 1938) was an American socialite, stage and film actress.

Early life and career
Born in New York City, Pinchot was the daughter of Amos Pinchot, a wealthy lawyer and a key figure in the Progressive Party and Gertrude Minturn Pinchot, the daughter of shipping magnate Robert Bowne Minturn, Jr. She had a younger brother, Gifford (nicknamed Long Giff). Her uncle was Pennsylvania Governor Gifford Pinchot and her cousin was Edie Sedgwick. The family divided their time between their home in New York City and the family estate, Grey Towers, in Milford, Pennsylvania. She graduated from Miss Chapin's School.

Her parents divorced in 1918. After the divorce, Pinchot and her brother lived with their mother in her townhouse in New York City. In 1919, Amos Pinchot married magazine writer Ruth Pickering with whom he would have two more children: Mary Eno and Antoinette "Tony" Pinchot.

Career
At the age of nineteen, Pinchot was discovered by Max Reinhardt while traveling on an ocean liner with her mother. Reinhardt cast her as a nun who runs away from a convent in the Broadway production of Karl Vollmoller's The Miracle.

Pinchot's appearance in the play caused a sensation and led to her receiving considerable attention from the press who named her "the loveliest woman in America".

Reinhardt later cast her in productions of William Shakespeare's A Midsummer Night's Dream and Franz Werfel's The Eternal Road. She made her only film appearance in the 1935 adaptation of The Three Musketeers, as Queen Anne.

Personal life
Pinchot married William "Big Bill" Gaston (who was previously married to Kay Francis), on January 26, 1928. The couple had two children, William Alexander Gaston and James Pinchot Gaston. In 1933, Pinchot and Gaston separated. They remained married but were estranged at the time of Pinchot's death.

Death
On the morning of January 24, 1938, a cook found Pinchot's body in the front seat of her car parked in the garage of a rented estate in Old Brookville, New York. Her death was later determined to be caused by asphyxia due to carbon monoxide poisoning and was ruled a suicide. Pinchot left two suicide notes, the contents of which were never made public.

Pinchot's funeral was held at her mother's townhouse in New York City on January 26, 1938, her tenth wedding anniversary. She was buried in the Pinchot family plot in Milford Cemetery in Milford, Pennsylvania.

Stage credits

Filmography

Footnotes

References

External links

 
 

1904 births
1938 deaths
20th-century American actresses
Actresses from New York City
American film actresses
American socialites
American stage actresses
Burials in Pennsylvania
American people of French descent
Deaths from asphyxiation
Pinchot family
Suicides by carbon monoxide poisoning
Suicides in New York (state)
1938 suicides
Female suicides
Winthrop family